Ionactis elegans, the Sierra Blanca least-daisy, is a rare North American species in the family Asteraceae. It has been found only in New Mexico in the western United States.

Description
The plant usually produces 1-3 flower heads, each with 10-24 white or pale lavender ray flowers surrounding yellow disc flowers.

References

Astereae
Flora of New Mexico
Plants described in 1984